Elkan Rex Makin, (20 August 1925 – 26 June 2017) usually known as Rex Makin, was a solicitor and philanthropist who practised in Liverpool, England, for over sixty years. He was most noted for his involvement with the Beatles' early career and subsequently high-profile cases such as the Hillsborough and Heysel Stadium disasters, the Walton sextuplets and the re-opening of the Cameo Murder case. A freeman of the City of Liverpool, he also supported the arts and held an honorary professorship at Liverpool John Moores University. He also wrote a weekly column in the Liverpool Echo.

Early life
Born in Birkenhead in 1925, Makin was the only child of Joe and May Makin. His family was Jewish and moved to Liverpool in the 1850s and his great-great grandfather set up shop as a seamens' outfitter in Old Hall Street. His father was brought up on Park Lane in the Chinatown area of Liverpool, where he made and supplied trunks to seamen.  Makin studied law at the University of Liverpool, gaining his LL.B in 1945 and LL.M in 1947.

Career
Makin was the family solicitor to Brian Epstein, who in 1963 sought his advice on setting up a perpetually binding contract between himself and the Beatles; however, Makin advised Epstein that such an agreement would be legally indefensible. He has been credited with inventing the term "Beatlemania". Following Epstein's death in 1967, Makin arranged his funeral.

Honours
In 2003 he was appointed a Freeman of the City of Liverpool, the first solicitor to receive that honour. He said at the time

References
Notes

Sources
Outrage as city conspiracy hearing slaps ban on Makin (Larry Neild, Daily Post)
Rex Makin obituary, The Guardian 11 July 2017.

External links
E Rex Makin & Co
Rex Makin Gallery
Alder Hey

1925 births
2017 deaths
English solicitors
Lawyers from Liverpool
Alumni of the University of Liverpool
People from Birkenhead
English Jews
20th-century English lawyers